The following highways are numbered 524:

Ireland
 R524 road (Ireland)

United States